Dorothy Grider (1915 – 2012) was an American artist, most widely known as an illustrator of children's books. Grider received a Bachelor of Arts degree from Western Kentucky State College and studied art at the Grande Chaumiere Art Studio in Paris, France.

Books
Grider illustrated numerous children's books, many for the Rand McNally Elf books collection.

Author and Illustrator
Little Ballerina

Peppermint

Little Majorette

The Mulberry Bush

Illustrator

References

American children's book illustrators
1915 births
2012 deaths
Artists from Kentucky
People from Bowling Green, Kentucky
New York School of Applied Design for Women alumni